The Third Way is a political position advocating a varying synthesis of right-wing and left-wing policies.

Third Way may also refer to:

Political ideologies
 Syncretic politics, politics outside of the conventional left–right political spectrum
 Third International Theory, a style of government proposed in Libya by Muammar Gaddafi
 Third Position, a revolutionary nationalist political position

Political organizations
 Third Way (France), a Third Position organization in France
 Third Way (Israel), a political party in Israel
 Third Way (Palestinian authority), a centrist Palestinian political party in the Palestinian National Authority
 Third Way (UK organisation), a right-wing think tank in the United Kingdom that was founded as a political party
 Third Way (United States), a public policy think tank in the United States
Third Way (Germany), a far right, neo-Nazi political party in Germany

Publications
 Third Way (magazine), a British Christian current affairs magazine
 The Third Way: The Renewal of Social Democracy, a 1998 book by the British sociologist Anthony Giddens

Other
 Socialist self-management, an economical model different from capitalism and Soviet Union socialism, adopted in Yugoslavia
 From Aquinas' "Five Ways" arguments for God's existence: the Third Way, the argument from contingency

See also
 The III. Path, a German neo-Nazi political party
 Third Ways, a 2007 book by Allan C. Carlson
 The 3rd Alternative, a 2011 book by Stephen Covey